For logistical reasons in 2008, the Evangelical Lutheran Church - Synod of France and Belgium divided into two separate synods: the Evangelical Lutheran Church - Synod of France, (or EEL-SF) and the Evangelical Lutheran Church in Belgium, (Evangelisch-Lutherse Kerk in België, or ELKB). Both are confessional Lutheran church bodies in France and in Belgium respectively. Over a dozen parishes belong to the two synods.

Both the EEL-SF and ELKB are members of the European Lutheran Conference. They are also members of the International Lutheran Council, of which the Lutheran Church–Missouri Synod of North America is also a member.

History
The EEL-SFB formed in 1927 by congregations founded during the 19th century when people left the Protestant Church of Augsburg Confession of Alsace and Lorraine for doctrinal reasons. Outreach started before and after World War 2. The Synod supports francophone churches in Central Africa and is involved in leadership training in West Africa. It currently has 957 baptized members in France.

For logistical reasons in 2008, the Evangelical Lutheran Church - Synod of France and Belgium divided into two separate synods: the Evangelical Lutheran Church - Synod of France, (or EEL-SF) and the Evangelical Lutheran Church in Belgium, or Evangelisch-Lutherse Kerk in België (ELKB).

Associations
The EEL-SFB is associated with the media outreach "L'Heure Luthérienne" (site: www.mediachrist.com), a spinoff from Lutheran Hour Ministries.

The EEL-SFB established a congregation in Burgdorf, Switzerland near Bern in 2010. In November 2014, the EEL-SFB officially established altar and pulpit fellowship with the Lutherische Bekenntniskirche in der Schweiz (LBKS) also known as Eglise Luthérienne Libre en Suisse or Iglesia Confesional Luterana en Suiza.  Bahnhofstrasse 12, Burgdorf, Switzerland. On August 28, 2017, the EEL-SFB participated in the start of an LBKS mission at Mettmenstetten near Zürich.

The ELKB partners with the "Eglise Luthérienne Malgache" (Lutheran Church of Madagascar). Services are mostly in Malagasy with parts in French.

EEL-SFB Presidents
2004–2008 Jean Thiéaut Haessig
After 2008, see EEL-SF or ELKB

ELKB Presidents
Gijsbertus van Hattem is the current president of the ELKB.
???–present Gijsbertus van Hattem

EEL-SF Presidents
Gleisson R. Schmidt is the current president of the EEL-SF.
2008–2012 François Poillet
2012–2016 Roger Jones
2016–2020 Martin Jautzy
2020-present Gleisson R. Schmidt

List of ELKB Congregations

Brussels. Pr. Johannes Reitze-Landau. Ave. Salomélaan 7, 1150 Woluwe-Saint Pierre. http://www.alcb.be

Antwerp. Pr Gijsbertus van Hattem. Tabakvest 59, 2000. http://users.skynet.be/lutherse.kerk

List of EEL-SF Congregations

Heiligenstein. Bas-Rhin. Pr Volff. 28 rue Principale. heiligenstein@eglise-lutherienne.org

Lembach. Bas-Rhin. Pr Heintz. 6 rue du Maire Dielmann. lembach@eglise-lutherienne.org

Mulhouse. Eglise Luthérienne du Christ. Pr Poillet. 21 chemin des Ardennes. mulhouse@eglise-lutherienne.org website

La Petite Pierre. Bas-Rhin. Pr Jautzy. 39 rue Kirchberg (maison de Retraite). kirchberg@libertysurf.fr

Schillersdorf. Bas-Rhin. Pr Jautzy. 16 rue Principale. schillersdorf@eglise-lutherienne.org

Strasbourg. Eglise Luthérienne de la Croix. Pr Volff. 6A place d'Austerlitz. strasbourg@eglise-lutherienne.org website

Woerth. Bas-Rhin Pr Heintz. 12 rue de Hagenau. woerth@eglise-lutherienne.org

Paris. St Sauveur. Pr Schmidt. 105 rue de l'Abbé Groult. 75015. paris@eglise-lutherienne.org St Sauveur website

Paris (Chatenay Malabry). Eglise Luthérienne Saint-Pierre. Pr Lara. 9 rue Jules Barbier. chatenay@eglise-lutherienne.org St Pierre website

Paris (Saint Maur des Fossés). Eglise Luthérienne Saint Jean. Pr Aoustin. 109 avenue Beaurepaire. saint-maur@eglise-lutherienne.org St Jean website

Poitou-Charentes. Mission.

Troyes. Mission.

External links
EEL-SF website
ELKB page on International Lutheran Council website
LBKS website
LBKS website
LBKS website

Footnotes

France Belgium
France Belgium
Christian organizations established in 1927